The  Serbian Orthodox Church of the Holy Prince Lazar, also known as Lazarica (Лазарица), is a Serbian Orthodox church located at Cob Lane in Bournville, Birmingham, England and was built for political refugees from Yugoslavia after World War II, with the support of the exiled Prince Tomislav of Yugoslavia. Serbs have been associated with Bournville since Dame Elizabeth Cadbury sponsored thirteen Serbian refugee children of World War I.

Built in traditional 14th-century Byzantine form by Yugoslavian architect Dr Dragomir Tadic and Bournville Village Trust, it is a replica of a church in Serbia using the same materials from sacred places of worship. Completed in 1968, it is of brick and stone with three sets of bronze doors and a candelabrum from Serbia. It has no seats, which is the usual thing for traditional Orthodox churches. Moreover, the interior has a full scheme of traditional Byzantine decoration. The dome contains the image of Christ Pantocrator, and the hemi-dome of the apse contains that of the Virgin Mary. At the bottom of the walls are the warrior saints, above these are patriarchs and priestly saints, and at the top are the apostles and scenes from the twelve major Christian feasts. These murals are painted fresco, meaning that the paint was applied meticulously to wet walls.

The cultural centre is a Grade C locally listed building.

See also
Serbian Orthodox Church
Lazar of Serbia
Serbs in the United Kingdom
Church of the Dormition of the Mother of God, Osijek

References

Further reading
Birmingham Buildings, The Architectural Story of a Midland City, Bryan Little, 1971, 
Images of England - Bournville and Weoley Castle, Martin Hampson, 2001,

External links
A reportage about the church

Churches in Birmingham, West Midlands
Serbian Orthodox church buildings in the United Kingdom
Churches completed in 1968
20th-century Serbian Orthodox church buildings
Byzantine Revival architecture in the United Kingdom
Church buildings with domes
20th-century churches in the United Kingdom